Jarosław Ziętara (born 16 September 1968) was a Polish journalist who disappeared on September 1, 1992, and was most probably kidnapped and murdered.

Biography
Jarosław Ziętara was a journalist of Gazeta Poznańska (he worked previously in Wprost and Gazeta Wyborcza), where he dealt with the investigative journalism examining economic scandals.

Disappearance and investigation
On 1 September 1992 he disappeared without a trace on his way to work. According to the findings of the prosecutor from 1998, Ziętara was kidnapped and murdered. 
The investigation into the Ziętara case had been, however, terminated in 1999, because his body was not found. The investigation led by the police, as well as the prosecutor, has been criticized repeatedly.

Aftermath
The case of the kidnapping and murder of Jarosław Ziętara is the only such case in the history of Poland after the fall of communism in 1989.

See also 
 List of people who disappeared
 List of journalists killed in Europe

References

External links
 Website dedicated to the case of Jarosław Ziętara

1968 births
1990s missing person cases
1992 deaths
Missing person cases in Poland
Assassinated Polish journalists
Writers from Bydgoszcz
20th-century Polish journalists